Hot Creek, starting as Mammoth Creek, is a stream in Mono County of eastern California, in the Western United States. It is within the Inyo National Forest.

Course

Mammoth Creek
The creek begins its course in the eastern Sierra Nevada named as Mammoth Creek. It originates as an outflow of Twin Lakes, just south of Mammoth Mountain and above the town of Mammoth Lakes. It is quite cold, rarely being above .

Hot Creek
As Mammoth Creek leaves the Sierra and flows east into the Long Valley Caldera it is joined by warmer water from geothermal springs at the Hot Creek State Fish Hatchery. In the Hot Creek Gorge, numerous hot springs near and in the stream bed add hot water into the stream. Its mouth is at the confluence with the Owens River upstream from Crowley Lake.

Ecology
The springs near Hot Creek host one of the two known Tui chub populations of the endangered Owens tui chub species.

The Long Valley Observatory of the United States Geological Survey (USGS), a volcano observatory, monitors spring activity, water temperatures and chemistry, and stream flow, as well as the caldera volcanic activity.

Hot Creek hydrothermal system

In hydrothermal systems, the circulation of ground water is driven by a combination of topography and geothermal heat sources. The system in the Long Valley Caldera is recharged primarily from snowmelt in the highlands around the western and southern rims of the caldera. The meltwater infiltrates to depths of a few kilometers (or miles), where some is heated to at least  by hot rock near the Inyo craters. It then flows eastward through rock layers to hydrothermal vent discharge points at the surface along Hot Creek and around Crowley Lake.

The springs in Hot Creek all emerge along a stream section between two faults and discharge a total of about 8.5 cubic feet per second (about 240 liters per second) of hot water.  This water flow represents nearly 70 percent of the total heat discharged by all thermal springs in Long Valley Caldera. The thermal springs farther east all discharge less water and at lower temperatures.

The larger and more vigorous springs discharge from fractures in the volcanic rock in the gorge. Rock fracturing happens because the thermal area lies within a region of frequent earthquakes and active uplift of the ground. When fractures become sealed by mineral deposition, spring discharge and temperature decline. When new fractures develop or sealed fractures reopen, spring discharge and temperatures can increase suddenly.

Access
The Hot Creek Gorge area of Hot Creek is managed by the U.S. Inyo National Forest as a geologic interpretive site and recreation area. It is popular for fishing, swimming, hiking, bird watching, and photography activities.

Dangers and recent activity

Hot Creek in the Hot Creek Gorge section can harbor dangers as the locations, discharge rates, and temperatures of springs often change. The changes can be sudden and dangerous to unprepared visitors (especially if entering beyond walkways and fences).

At times this geysering activity is vigorous enough to produce "popping" sounds audible from hundreds of feet away. The geysering usually lasts a few seconds and occurs at irregular intervals, with several minutes between eruptions. Fumaroles, or steam vents, are also located in the gorge. They can occur in the ground beyond the creek bed. The unpredictability of this hazardous spring activity led the U.S. Forest Service to close parts of the Hot Creek Gorge in June 2006, and the closure has remained in effect as of February 2016.

Hot Creek Gorge was a filming location in the 1969 film True Grit, as well as the 1960 film North to Alaska also starring John Wayne, the 1966 Steve McQueen film Nevada Smith, and the 1971 film Shoot Out with Gregory Peck, which also starred True Grit's Jeff Corey.

See also
Bishop Tuff
Mono Basin National Scenic Area

References

External links
USGS: Geology of Hot Creek and Hot Creek Gorge
USGS: Long Valley Caldera Virtual Tour
U.S. Geological Survey Volcano Hazards Program: Long Valley Observatory website

Hot springs of California
Rivers of Mono County, California
Rivers of the Sierra Nevada (United States)
Tributaries of the Owens River
Inyo National Forest
Rivers of Northern California
Hot springs of Mono County, California
Rivers of the Sierra Nevada in California